Policko may refer to the following places:
Policko, Greater Poland Voivodeship (west-central Poland)
Policko, Lubusz Voivodeship (west Poland)
Policko, Koszalin County in West Pomeranian Voivodeship (north-west Poland)
Policko, Łobez County in West Pomeranian Voivodeship (north-west Poland)